Kjellaug is a given name. Notable people with the name include:

Kjellaug Nakkim (1940–2022), Norwegian politician
Kjellaug Nordsjö (1926–2021), Swedish-Norwegian artist
Kjellaug Pettersen (1934–2012), Norwegian senior government official, politician, and feminist
Kjellaug Steinslett (1946–2011), Norwegian novelist